Thierry Vincent is a French team handball coach. He coaches the Ivorian national team, and participated at the 2011 World Women's Handball Championship in Brazil.

References

Living people
French male handball players
Year of birth missing (living people)
French handball coaches